Drepanotrema is a genus of molluscs in the family Planorbidae. Two subgenera, Drepanotrema (Drepanotrema) Fischer & Crosse, 1880 and Drepanotrema (Fossulorbis) Pilsbry, 1934, have been eschewed in favour of the genus.

Species
Drepanotrema anatinum (d'Orbigny, 1835)
Drepanotrema cimex (Moricand, 1839)
Drepanotrema depressissimum (Moricand, 1839)
Drepanotrema heloicum (d'Orbigny, 1835)
Drepanotrema kermatoides (d'Orbigny, 1835)
Drepanotrema limayanum (Lesson, 1830)
Drepanotrema lucidum (Pfeiffer, 1839)
Drepanotrema pfeifferi (Strobel, 1874)
Drepanotrema surinamense (Clessin, 1884)

References

Planorbidae